Üzümlü is a Turkish place name and it may refer to;

Üzümlü, a district of Erzincan Province, Turkey
Üzümlü, Bayramiç
Üzümlü, Dicle
Üzümlü, Ergani
Üzümlü, a village in Kaş district of Antalya Province, Turkey
Üzümlü, a village in Şavşat district of Artvin Province, Turkey
Üzümlü, a village in Germencik district of Aydın Province, Turkey
Üzümlü, a village in Erdemli district of Mersin Province, Turkey
Üzümlü, a village in the municipality of Əmirxanlı in the Davachi Rayon of Azerbaijan
Üzümlü, a village in Gölpazarı district of Bilecik Province, Turkey

 Üzümlü, Azerbaijan
 Üzümlükənd